Diogo Justino Medeiros (born July 8, 1985 in Uberlândia), known as Diogo Medeiros, is a Brazilian footballer who plays as midfielder for Independente. He already played for national competitions such as Copa do Brasil and Campeonato Brasileiro Série C.

Career statistics

References

External links

1985 births
Living people
Brazilian footballers
Association football midfielders
Campeonato Brasileiro Série C players
Clube Recreativo e Atlético Catalano players